Lleida–Alguaire Airport  (Catalan: Aeroport de Lleida-Alguaire, Spanish: Aeropuerto de Lérida-Alguaire) is an airport located in Alguaire, Catalonia, Spain; about  from the centre of Lleida and about  from the centre of Barcelona.

History 
Lleida–Alguaire was designed as a regional airport to provide both passenger and cargo transport to Western Catalonia (the Ponent region and Catalan Pyrenees), Andorra and some counties (comarques) in La Franja. The airport construction project had a budget of 130 million euro and it was the first airport built and owned by the Generalitat of Catalonia, via its public-capital company Aeroports de Catalunya. It is also one of the few Spanish airports not owned by Aena.

The airport was inaugurated on 17 January 2010.

Airlines and destinations

Statistics

The following table shows total passenger numbers at Lleida–Alguaire Airport from 2010 to date.

Ground transportation 
Two new highways, the Autovías A-14 and A-22, provide road access to the airport.

References

External links

 
 
 Lleida–Alguaire Airport at Architecture News Plus

Airports established in 2010
Airports in Catalonia
Transport in Lleida
Transport in Segrià